Eden Detention Center is a privately owned and operated prison for men located in Eden, Concho County, Texas, run by the Corrections Corporation of America.  The low security facility opened in 1985 under a contract with the Federal Bureau of Prisons (FBOP).

In August 2016, Department of Justice officials announced that the FBOP would be phasing out its use of contracted facilities, on the grounds that private prisons provided less safe and less effective services with no substantial cost savings.  The agency expects to allow current contracts on its thirteen remaining private facilities to expire.

The facility closed in 2017 when the contract with the FBOP ended. The facility reopened in 2019 under a new contract with the United States Marshals Service for 844 beds and the U.S. Immigration and Customs Enforcement for 660 beds.

References

Prisons in Texas
Buildings and structures in Concho County, Texas
CoreCivic
1985 establishments in Texas